Lester Alcides Lescay Gay (born 15 October 2001) is a Cuban athlete who competes in the long jump.

He won silver at the 2017 IAAF World U18 Championships long jump competition behind teammate Maikel Vidal.

He won gold at the 2018 Summer Youth Olympics long jump competition.

Lescay was included in Cuba’s squad for the delayed 2020 Tokyo Olympics based on his 8.28m jump on the 23 February 2020 in Camagüey. It was the fourth longest men’s senior outdoor long jump of 2020. It also placed him tenth on the Cuban all time list, as well as the sixth u20 in the world of all time.

References

Living people
2001 births
Cuban male long jumpers
Athletes (track and field) at the 2018 Summer Youth Olympics
Youth Olympic gold medalists for Cuba
Athletes (track and field) at the 2020 Summer Olympics
Olympic athletes of Cuba
21st-century Cuban people